Megachile submetallica is a species of bee in the family Megachilidae. It was described by Benoist in 1955.

References

Submetallica
Insects described in 1955